Anniversary Trouble is a 1935 Our Gang short comedy film directed by Gus Meins. It was the 134th Our Gang short (46th talking episode) that was released.

Plot
Spanky's appointment as treasurer of the Ancient and Honery Order of Woodchucks occurs on the same day as his parents' wedding anniversary. Spanky's father (Johnny Arthur) puts money in an envelope as an anniversary gift for his wife (Claudia Dell), then absent-mindedly uses the envelope as a bookmark.

Spanky's mother sees Spanky hide the gang's club money in a cookie jar and jumps to the conclusion that Spanky stole her gift envelope. She takes that money and shows it to Spanky's father who also jumps to the wrong conclusion.  Spanky is looking for the money and cannot find it. Minutes later, the other Woodchucks demand the return of their "dough," as the club had just broken up. Spanky cannot accommodate them. Spanky's father calls the maid/nanny and tells her to send him to his dad's office for punishment immediately. Spanky is unable to leave because the gang is blocking the exits out of his house. Spanky then tries to sneak out by painting himself in blackface and dressing up like Buckwheat, the maid/nanny's son. That plan is also foiled and then Spanky's parents return home.

Spanky puts the book with the anniversary money in his back pocket to protect himself from a spanking. His father discovers the gift envelope in the book and realises his mistake. So that his mother thinks the spanking is being carried out and can remain unaware of the mistake, Spanky's father has Spanky spank him instead and has Spanky make the groaning noises. Spanky's mother though catches them leading to a wild and wooly conclusion wherein Spanky's dad is duly punished for his faulty memory.

Notes
The television broadcast version of Anniversary Trouble has been radically edited, removing the sequence in which Spanky dons blackface to disguise himself as Billy "Buckwheat" Thomas due to perceived racism against African Americans. It was only partially restored on the 2001 to 2003 showings over AMC. It was finally available unedited on VHS home video from the early 1980s until the late 1990s.

Cast

The Gang
 George McFarland as Spanky
 Matthew Beard as Stymie
 Scotty Beckett as Scotty
 Billie Thomas as Buckwheat
 Alvin Buckelew as Alvin
 Leonard Kibrick as Leonard
 Jerry Tucker as Jerry
 Sidney Kibrick as Our Gang member
 Harry Harvey Jr. as Our Gang member
 Donald Proffitt as Our Gang member
 Merrill Strong as Our Gang member
 Pete the Pup as himself

Additional cast
 Johnny Arthur as John, Spanky's father
 Claudia Dell as Spanky's mother
 Hattie McDaniel as Mandy, the maid
 Cecelia Murray as Girl with doll
 Tony Kales as Undetermined role

See also
 Our Gang filmography

References

External links

1935 films
American black-and-white films
Films directed by Gus Meins
Hal Roach Studios short films
1935 comedy films
Our Gang films
1930s American films